Urban Diversion is a San Francisco Bay Area activities and adventures social club.  Established in 2003, the company reportedly serves over 700 members and hosts and organizes 35-50 unique events each month in San Francisco, the East Bay, and the South Bay.  Urban Diversion is an outlet for professionals in their 20s, 30s, and 40s to meet new people and try an eclectic range of activities.

History 
Urban Diversion is the brainchild of ex dot-com veterans Topher Thiessen and Lance Evander.  They had a dream to turn a lifestyle of leisure and recreation into a business, where the priorities are having fun, experiencing adventures, and making new friends.  Their main mission was to give young professionals an affordable way to enhance their social lives and free time. 

The company features a members-only Clubhouse in San Francisco’s Fisherman's Wharf neighborhood, and two ski cabins on Lake Tahoe.  Urban Diversion offers a wide variety of events ranging from hiking, kayaking, and camping weekends, to signature events like their Limo Scavenger Hunts and annual Pirate Ship Party.   The Clubhouse boasts a Tiki-themed full bar, an entertainment room complete with in-house theater, TiVo, and full stereo system, and a main socializing and events room furnished with plush couches and a wide open window view.  They also plan group international vacations to destinations such as Thailand, Costa Rica, Africa, and Europe.

References

External links
 Urban Diversion Website

Organizations based in the San Francisco Bay Area
2003 establishments in California